A Place in the World is the third studio album by Australian rock band The Black Sorrows. The album was released in November 1985. All tracks were written by band members Joe Camilleri and Nick Smith, except "Let the Four Winds Blow".

Review
The Canberra Times Debbie Cameron noted the album was, "a cocktail of styles — from a strong piano accordion and calypso sound in "A Place in the World", to good dancing in "Country Girls", through a rocky but unremarkable "The Final Touch" and to a tragic "Sons of the Sea"". Although Cameron preferred Sonola, she found A Place in the World had "the action, the beat and the melody of Ry Cooder".

Track listing 
 CD track listing

Personnel
Accordion – George Butrumlis
Bass – Joe Creighton
Cover – Richard Lewis 
Drums, washboard – Peter Luscombe
Engineer – Gary Constable
Guitar – Jeff Burstin, Ross Hannaford, Andrew Pendlebury
Harmony vocals – Nick Smith, The Blackberries 
Illustration – Jenny Aitken
Lap steel guitar – Ed Bates
Violin – Steve McTaggart, Danny Bourke

References

External links
 "A Place in the World" at discogs.com

1985 albums
The Black Sorrows albums
Albums produced by Joe Camilleri